The Town of Green Mountain Falls is a Statutory Town located in El Paso and Teller counties of the U.S. of State of Colorado. The town population was 646 at the 2020 United States Census with 622 residents in El Paso County and 24 residents in Teller County. Green Mountain Falls is a part of the Colorado Springs, CO Metropolitan Statistical Area and the Front Range Urban Corridor.

In 1968, officials in Green Mountain Falls conducted a resurvey of the 1890 legal description of the town's corporate limits and found "that the town hall, the magistrate's office, the post office, the community center, the civic swimming pool, and nearly half of the residents are located outside city limits" and were forced to redraw the legal boundaries.

Geography
Green Mountain Falls is located at  (38.934621, −105.017645).

At the 2020 United States Census, the town had a total area of  including  of water.

Demographics

As of the census of 2000, there were 773 people, 372 households, and 203 families residing in the town. The racial makeup of the town was 94.18% White, 0.13% African American, 1.55% Native American, 0.39% Asian, 0.13% Pacific Islander, 1.68% from other races, and 1.94% from two or more races. Hispanic or Latino of any race were 5.56% of the population.

There were 372 households, out of which 23.1% had children under the age of 18 living with them, 43.5% were married couples living together, 7.0% had a female householder with no husband present, and 45.4% were non-families. 36.0% of all households were made up of individuals, and 7.3% had someone living alone who was 65 years of age or older.  The average household size was 2.08 and the average family size was 2.74.

In the town, the population was spread out, with 19.1% under the age of 18, 5.7% from 18 to 24, 33.2% from 25 to 44, 34.0% from 45 to 64, and 7.9% who were 65 years of age or older.  The median age was 41 years. For every 100 females, there were 104.0 males.  For every 100 females age 18 and over, there were 92.9 males.

The median income for a household in the town was $43,816, and the median income for a family was $55,268. Males had a median income of $34,000 versus $26,354 for females. The per capita income for the town was $24,892.  About 4.3% of families and 7.6% of the population were below the poverty line, including 10.1% of those under age 18 and 7.8% of those age 65 or over.

Government and politics
On April 5, 2016, Jane Newberry was elected mayor.  She ran as a slate of candidates calling themselves Smoother Road Ahead for GMF. The group also included board of trustees candidates David Pearlman, Cameron Thorne and Erin Kowal.  The police force resigned in the days following an April 14, 2016 closed-door meeting of the outgoing town board and mayor.

See also

Colorado
Bibliography of Colorado
Index of Colorado-related articles
Outline of Colorado
List of counties in Colorado
List of municipalities in Colorado
List of places in Colorado
List of statistical areas in Colorado
Front Range Urban Corridor
South Central Colorado Urban Area
Colorado Springs, CO Metropolitan Statistical Area

References

External links

Town of Green Mountain Falls website
CDOT map of the Town of Green Mountain Falls

Towns in El Paso County, Colorado
Towns in Teller County, Colorado
Towns in Colorado